Star Awards 2021 (Chinese: 红星大奖2021) is a television award ceremony that was held in Singapore on 18 April 2021. The ceremony honoured the best Singaporean television released between January 2019 and December 2020. The ceremony was delayed for a year due to the COVID-19 pandemic

The Star Awards 2021 is in its 26th edition, with the theme connect (星起点), showing the role that the media companies and other industry partners are playing in engaging television audiences during the COVID-19 pandemic in Singapore during the previous year.

Period drama A Quest to Heal won five awards including Best Drama Serial, Best Lead and Supporting Actors, Best Theme Song, and Best Director, the last of which was awarded in an unaired Backstage Achievement Award. Other winners include Zoe Tay of My Guardian Angels and Kym Ng of Daybreak, who won Best Lead and Supporting Actresses respectively, the former breaking a winning record of four wins. The drama with the most nominations, A Jungle Survivor, won only one award, with Zhang Ze Tong clinching the Best Newcomer. In the Variety category, Star Awards reclaimed a record-breaking eighth win for a Variety Special while Hear U Out became the biggest winner for a variety program with two.

In popularity awards, Dasmond Koh was named the year's All-Time Favourite Artiste. Dennis Chew and Zheng Geping won their tenth Top 10 Most Favourite Artiste, while Marcus Chin, Hong Ling and Bonnie Loo won their first Top 10.

The ceremony also drew several controversies, notably on the results for the Top 10 Most Popular Artistes after Felicia Chin fell short on winning her tenth award, as well as social distancing measures leading to Mediacorp clarifying about the measures taken.

Programme details

Winners and nominees

Awards 
The nominees were announced on 4 February 2021. Winners are listed first, followed by boldface.

Drama series with multiple awards and nominations
The following Series received two or more awards and nominations:

Programmes with multiple awards and nominations
The following Programmes received two or more awards and nominations:

Sponsors awards
Bioskin Most Charismatic Artiste Award, alongside Best Theme Song and Best Radio Programme, are awards eligible via online voting. Voting began on 10 March and ended on 9 April at 11.59pm. 

The Best Radio Programme was introduced in this year Star Awards to honor the best in local radio

The results are announced on the Walk-of-fame.

Special awards

Top 10 Most Popular Artists 
The top 10 nominations were announced on 9 March 2021 with several changes, with 60 artistes (30 of each gender) compete via a popular vote for the Top 10; for the first time in Star Awards history, there will be no televoting.

50% of the votes are determined by online voting, while the other 50% are based on the initial polling results of 1,000 people representing a wide demographic across Singapore's population, conducted independently by an accredited market research company.

With the combination of both years of ceremonies, 2020 and 2021, scores for both years for eligible artistes will be averaged by two; if the artiste is only eligible on either 2020 or 2021, only the scores that are tabulated on the eligible year is counted; artistes who are eligible in 2020 will only have their scores in 2020 tabulated; the reverse is true for artistes eligible only in 2021.

Voting began on 10 March, 12:00pm and ended on 18 April, 8:00pm, during the ceremony. Additionally, each user was limited to one vote per day, but the restriction was lifted to allow unlimited voting during the final three hours of voting.

 Pornsak and Yvonne Lim were not present during the ceremony.

Ceremony

Event details

Event schedule 
Nominees Announcement: 4 February 2021 
Top 10 Nominees Announcement: 9 March 2021
Walk-of-Fame, Awards Ceremony: 18 April 2021

Hosts and venue 
Backstage Hosts: Dennis Chew, Jeremy Chan, Juin Teh, Hazelle Teo
Backstage Venue: Changi Terminal 4, Heritage Zone
Walk-of-Fame Hosts: Lee Teng, Vivian Lai, Desmond Ng
Walk-of-Fame Venue: Main Entrance of Changi Terminal 4

Awards Ceremony Hosts and their respective venue:
Changi Jewel – The Rain Vortex (Guo Liang, Quan Yifong)
Changi Terminal 4 – Gate 18 (Cavin Soh)
Changi Terminal 4 – Gate 12 (Lee Teng)
Changi Terminal 4 – Bloom Garden Lounge (Vivian Lai)
Changi Terminal 4 – Departure Transit Hall (Dennis Chew)

Awards trivia
This is the first time since 2014 whereas the award ceremony was held outside Mediacorp studios, this time at the Jewel Changi Airport and on Terminal 4. Not counting double awards shows (with the first show held at the studios and a second show at another location), this is the first time since 2006 to have this situation organically.
Due to the expanded period of eligibility (see Impact of the COVID–19 pandemic below), this is the second ceremony to have more than the typical five nominations for most of the awards categories (except Best Radio Programme and Best Entertainment Special), with seven nominations.
This was previously used in the 2009 ceremony where each category have six nominations due to the revision of the eligibility period. Coincidentally, both ceremonies' preceding year do not have a ceremony.
This is also the third ceremony overall to have an increase of the usual number of nominations (20) for the Top 10 Most Popular Artiste award, with 30. The first two ceremonies with an increase were in 2011 (21) and 2017 (24).

Consecutive and records in award categories, first in Top 10 
Zoe Tay surpassed Fann Wong's count for the number of nominations for the Best Actress, with 14. She also broke a record for the most number of wins with four, surpassing Huang Biren, Ivy Lee and Chen Liping with three.
C.L.I.F. became the first drama series to have been nominated for five occasions for Best Drama Serial (the other being 2012, 2014, 2015 and 2017), more than any other drama serials to date.
Out of the 31 artistes who did not receive a Top 10 nomination in 2019, 16 artistes were nominated for the first time, more than any number of artistes in a single year. This award also marks the first appearance of a number of artistes nominated in the Top 10 after long absences: 
Edwin Goh and Yvonne Lim who both last nominated in 2014, seven years ago.
Ann Kok who last nominated in 2013, eight years ago.
Henry Thia who last nominated in 2009, 12 years ago.
Darren Lim who last nominated in 1999, 22 years ago. 
Of these, Lim hold the record of having the longest gap between his two nominations for any of the Top 10 Most Popular Male Artistes, and is tied along with Lina Ng for the second longest gap for any artistes, behind Chen Xiuhuan's 24. Lim also now hold the record of having a longest gap of nominations without a win.
Marcus Chin, Hong Ling and Bonnie Loo won their first Top 10 after nine, three and four nominations, respectively. 
Star Awards won its eighth Entertainment Special award since 2017, surpassing the record of seven tying with NKF Charity Show.
Quan Yi Fong won her fourth consecutive Best Programme Host, and her seventh hosting role including Info-ed Hosts prior to 2015.

Impact of the COVID–19 pandemic 

The COVID-19 pandemic saw postponements in television production and Mediacorp had since suspended studio audience starting 7 February. The ceremony was first announced to be held on 26 April 2020, but in an announcement on 19 February 2020, the ceremony was delayed to the second half of the year, and that the original date falls on the period of "Circuit Breaker" (between 7 April and 1 June). On 7 August, Mediacorp announced that the ceremony will not be held in the 2020 year and delaying it to 18 April 2021, and the eligibility periods for the television series would be extended through 31 December 2020. Despite having options on conducting ceremonies virtually, Mediacorp chose to combine both the 2020 and 2021 ceremonies into a single ceremony as a 'bigger celebration', adding that the decision was to "continue to place the health and safety of our artistes, crew and guests as a top priority." This postponement resulted in 2020 being the second calendar year to not host a ceremony, after 2008 (which was postponed due to the revision of eligibility criteria).

On 6 April 2021, the show confirmed that the ceremony will take place at Changi Airport Terminal 4 and Jewel Changi Airport, and additional changes are made such as walking on a tarmac against the backdrop of a Singapore Airlines Airbus A350-900 replacing the traditional red carpet. Overseas guests are still featured but they are broadcast by teleconferencing from either Hong Kong or Taiwan due to the travel restrictions, which was also seen in several other award ceremonies globally. The ceremony will also be conducted closed-doors, a first in Star Awards history without a live audience. Additionally, during the ceremony, there are no handover of awards (similar to the 2007's Award (25th Drama Anniversary)), as the award is collected by the recipient itself.

Reception and controversy

During the ceremony, artistes were seen neither wearing a mask nor a face shield throughout the ceremony and took them off during broadcast, as seen on other televised live shows. However, social media and netizens began querying to Mediacorp on the safety of mask wearing, contradicting any social distancing measures, and whether or not it is safe to do so. Other netizens compared the ceremonies that held earlier this year, such as the TVB Anniversary Awards, which they do wore mask during the ceremony.

In a post-ceremony interview, celebrities such as Hong Ling, Bonnie Loo, Dennis Chew, Marcus Chin, and Chen Shucheng, revealed that the set has been adhered to social-distancing measures in which Mediacorp had been following with. Chen also revealed on an interview that he have wore a mask while making their way to the Walk of Fame, and removed it only when he arrived.

The Infocomm Media Development Authority (IMDA) replied that the ceremony did not violate any rules, including a gathering of up to 50 people in a taping venue during filming; at anytime, no more than 20 artistes are permitted not to wear masks; following the safe distancing requirements with a minimum one-meter. IMDA announced that they will not take any action.

Lianhe Zaobao, who also did separate commentaries during the ceremony, separately questioned Mediacorp on three claims, on the uneven airtime of certain celebrities, the handling of results, and the Top 10 Most Popular Artiste voting system, the last of which receiving headlines following frontrunner Felicia Chin failing to win her tenth Top 10 and thus preventing her to be conferred the All-Time Favourite Artiste next year, which Dennis Chew and Zheng Ge Ping were able to do so during the ceremony. The address was issued under the guidance of Mediacorp's Chief content officer Doreen Neo.

Mediacorp first addressed on the airtime that the artistes appearing during the Walk of Fame is limited to 90 minutes (including commercials) and thus airtime are given priority to Mediacorp artistes. Mediacorp also announced that the ceremony was planned several months ago, and the list of artistes have been arranged, ending that it has no relation with the claim and will not exclude specific artists or brokerage companies.

Mediacorp also emphasized that the Top 10 Most Popular Artiste voting system was announced prior on 4 February that 50% of the vote comes from the demographic of 1,000 people while the other 50% constitutes on online voting; these voting format was first introduced in the 2018 ceremony and was intact since. Mediacorp also announced that the "unlimited voting limit" (happening within the final three hours of the voting window) was implemented to encourage audience participation, as it was previously done in their web-streaming websites meWatch and its YouTube's channel Mediacorp Entertainment.

Finally, Mediacorp revealed that the increase of nominations from five to seven to accommodate the two-year format, was meant to affirm the qualifications for candidates and programs under the qualifying period (January 2019 to December 2020). All nominations went through a qualification criteria auditing under the PricewaterhouseCoopers (PwC) film, and a judging panel (consist of 70% of professional critics and 30% of Mediacorp personnel). All of the results are final by the judging panel itself and to ensure professionalism and transparency, and that the awards are given out in excellence on the efforts and contributions of works and its production. The opinions that put forward in the comments must be true and free with no prejudice.

Mediacorp concluded that they have dismissed the claims, ensuring that these refutes and its reports would not happen again.

Presenters and performers
The following presenters were announced on 6 April 2021.

Presenters

Performers

Related programme 

A 10-episode talkshow, The Inner Circle, was broadcast before the ceremony as a spin-off series. It premiered on 17 February 2021 from 8:00pm every Wednesdays. The series, hosted by Guo Liang, discusses the inside stories of ten All-Time Favourite Artiste recipients in Star Awards, leading up to the ceremony airing on 18 April. No episode was aired on 24 February due to the launch of Disney+ in Singapore and the launch event titled A Night of Disney+.

Notelist

References

External links

Star Awards
Impact of the COVID-19 pandemic on television
Events postponed due to the COVID-19 pandemic
2021 in Singaporean television